Melusi Yeni (born 22 October 1977), is a South African actor and singer. He is best known for the roles in the television serials; Tshisa, Home Affairs, Sokhulu & Partners and Generations.

Personal life
Yeni was born on 22 October 1977 in KwaMashu, South Africa.

In 2016, he was hospitalized due to poor health conditions. He had to receive treatments for two weeks at the hospital. He became the KZN's millionth man to be circumcised.

He has a 10-month-old child with Palesa Molemela, where he had to appear at Randburg Magistrate Court for his maintenance case with baby's mother.

Career
In 2006, he moved to Johannesburg to pursue a career in acting. Before starting acting, he had a stint with the Natal Youth Choir as a singer. Then he got the opportunity to tour with South African supergroup called "Ladysmith Black Mambazo". In 1997, he acted in the SABC3 soap opera Isidingo, and then in SABC2 soap opera Muvhango. In 2006, he joined with the third season in the episode entitled "The Three Sisters (Part 1)" of SABC1 serial Mtunzini.com with the role "Zam".

In the same year, he joined with the SABC1 drama serial Tshisa for the role of "Bheki Shabalala". The show became very popular, where he continued to play the role for three consecutive year until 2009. Then in 2012, he made a guest appearance in the first two episodes of the serial. In 2011, he joined with the M-Net soap opera The Wild and played the role as "Isaac Tladi" until 2012. After that role, he joined with the SABC1 soap opera Generations from February 2012 to December 2013 where he played the role "Phenyo Mazibuko". He was fired from the show in 2013, where he retired from television for two years. In 2007, he appeared in the third and fourth seasons of the SABC1 drama Home Affairs.

In 2008, he made his first television lead role of "Mabutho Sokhulu" in the SABC1 drama series Sokhulu & Partners. With that popularity, he continued to play the role until 2016. In the meantime, he played the role of "Mthunzi" in the SABC1 mini-serial Shreds & Dreams in 2011. After retired from Sokhulu & Partners, he joined with the e.tv soap opera Rhythm City and played the role of "Thabiso". In 2019, he appeared in the Imbewu: The Seed with the role "Manqoba Dlamini".

Apart from acting, he joined with the social and well-being movement called "Brothers for Life" to partner on a campaign that raise awareness on men's health. In 2017, he founded the theatre production and events management company called "Langa Libalele Enterprises".

Filmography

References

External links
 IMDb

Living people
South African male film actors
South African male television actors
1977 births